Samuel Sachs 2nd (born November 30, 1935) is an American museum professional. He has served as the director of The Frick Collection, The Detroit Institute of Arts, and The Minneapolis Institute of Art, and as the president of Pollock-Krasner Foundation.

Early life and education

Sachs was born in New York City on November 30, 1935. He graduated from Middlesex School in 1953. He received his Bachelor of Arts, cum laude, from Harvard University in 1957 and his Master of Arts degree from New York University Institute Fine Arts in 1962.

Career

Sachs became the director of The Frick Collection in 1997. Here he led the public access of the museum’s collection and The Frick Art Reference Library, building renovation, talent acquisition and, digital and online development of the museum. He also organized several exhibitions, including 'Velázquez in New York Museums’, 'El Greco: Themes and Variations' and 'The Medieval Hausbook: A View of 15th-Century Life’. Sachs retired as director of Frick Collection in 2003.

In 2004, Sachs became the president of the Pollock-Krasner Foundation and is responsible for the activities of the foundation including making grants to individual artists and managing the sales and loans of the Foundation’s art works. 

In 2007-2008, Sachs was a Visiting Fellow at Oriel College, Oxford, UK.

Sachs was the director of the Minneapolis Institute of Art from 1973 to 1985. At MIA, he organized the notable MIA exhibition on art fakes and another on The Vikings. He was also the juror for the Minnesota State Fair Fine Arts Show. He was the assistant director of the Museum of Art and lecturer at University of Michigan in Ann Arbor from 1963 to 1964, and was the director at Detroit Institute Arts from 1985 to 1997.

Publications

Recognition
Sachs is a decorated knight 1st class Order North Star (Sweden) and Order of Dannebrog (Denmark).

References

New York University Institute of Fine Arts alumni
Harvard College alumni
University of Michigan faculty